Channel 8 is a Singaporean free-to-air television channel, airing in Mandarin Chinese. It was created by Television Singapura on 31 August 1963 with experimental broadcasts, before officially launching on 23 November that year.

History
Channel 8 began its test transmissions on Saturday, 31 August 1963, Malaysia's national day. Its first day consisted of a Hokkien film, repeats of India's participation in the South East Asian Cultural Festival and Singapore Celebrates. A second test transmission took place between 16 and 20 September of that year and devoted much of its time to the week-long celebrations, to coincide with the historic Proclamation of Malaysia, and the political campaigns leading up to the 1963 General Election.

Channel 8 officially began broadcasting on 23 November 1963 at 7:40 p.m. as "Saluran 8 Televisyen Singapura" and aired at first in Chinese (including Mandarin, dialects of Chinese and Cantonese) and Tamil. Its sister station Saluran 5 Televisyen Singapura was launched on 2 April that year with a mix of English and Malay-language shows. Following the separation from Malaysia on 9 August 1965, Channel 8 became part of Television Singapore, and was later integrated as part of "Radio Television Singapore". This led to the expansions of the network, including a move to the new $3.6 million Television Centre in Caldecott Hill on 26 August 1966.

Channel 8 began broadcasting in colour on 1 May 1974. In 1978, all its Chinese language programming as well as advertisements, as a result of the government's Speak Mandarin Campaign, began to be broadcast solely in the Mandarin dialect. In the fall of 1982, Channel 8 debuted the country's pioneer Mandarin language drama series, Seletar Robbery. At first, Channel 8 drama productions used 16mm film, before transitioning to videotape in 1987–88, in contrast its variety programming (either live or taped) had always been videotape productions since the start of colour television. Beginning 1 August 1990, Channel 8 began airing in stereo all its Chinese and Tamil productions.

It started airing 24 hours a day on 1 September 1995, becoming a Mandarin-language only channel as all its Tamil programs were transferred to a new channel, Prime 12. It was privatised on 12 February 2001 as part of Mediacorp.

Channel 8 had a pay-to-view sister television channel named Channel 8i that existed from 19 November 2011 to 1 December 2016.

References

External links
Official Website

Chinese-language television
Channel 8
Channel 8
Television stations in Singapore
1963 establishments in Singapore